Maghera is a civil parish in County Down, Northern Ireland. It is situated in the historic barony of Iveagh Upper, Lower Half.

Townlands
Maghera civil parish contains the following townlands:

Ballyginny
Ballyloughlin
Carnacavill
Drumee
Murlough Upper
Tollymore

See also
List of civil parishes of County Down

References